Plutarch of Chaeronea (c. 46–120) was a Greek historian, biographer, essayist, and Middle Platonist.

Plutarch may also refer to the following people:
 Plutarch of Alexandria, an ancient Greek grammarian and deipnosophist
 Plutarch of Athens (circa 350-430), Greek philosopher and Neoplatonist
 Plutarch of Byzantium (1st century), Bishop of Byzantium
 Plutarch of Eretria (4th century BC), tyrant of Eretria
 Plutarch Heavensbee, The Head Gamemaker in the 75th Hunger Games
 Saint Plutarch (died 202 AD), Egyptian martyr

Places
 Plutarch (crater), a lunar impact crater
 Plutarch, Kentucky, an unincorporated community in Magoffin County

Greek masculine given names

ca:Plutarc (desambiguació)
es:Plutarco (desambiguación)
gl:Plutarco